Issac Sewell (September 9, 1903 – August 20, 1990) was an American athlete, businessman, entrepreneur, and founder of the Uno Chicago Grill restaurant chain that originated in Chicago, Illinois, as well as founder of the Pizzeria Uno and Pizzeria Due restaurants there in 1943 and 1955, respectively. Sewell started as an All-Southwestern Conference guard as a player on the Texas Longhorn football teams from 1926 to 1929.

Biography

Early life and career
Sewell was born in Wills Point, Texas, 50 miles east of Dallas, and grew up in San Antonio. A graduate of the University of Texas at Austin, Sewell achieved both All-Southwest Conference (SWC) and All-American honors as a guard on the Longhorn football squad. Sewell was a member of the Sigma Chi fraternity.

Pizzeria Uno and Su Casa restaurants
In 1943 Sewell opened Pizzeria Uno restaurant at the corner of Ohio Street and Wabash Avenue in Chicago, offering the first Chicago deep dish pizza. He had originally intended to open a Mexican restaurant. Ric Riccardo and Sewell would eventually expand and open up another restaurant, Pizzeria Due, just a block away from Pizzeria Uno, in 1955. Sewell would also open up the Chicago area's first upscale Tex-Mex restaurant, Su Casa, in 1963.

Death
Just 20 days before his 87th birthday, Sewell died in Northwestern Memorial Hospital in Chicago on August 20, 1990 after suffering from a lengthy bout with leukemia for several years. He was survived by his wife Florence Davis as well as his children and several grandchildren.

References

External links
 Texas Longhorns football profile (Archived)

1903 births
1990 deaths
Fast-food chain founders
American restaurateurs
Texas Longhorns football players
People from Dallas
People from San Antonio
People from Wills Point, Texas
Deaths from leukemia
20th-century American businesspeople